The Moat Theatre is a theatre and arts centre in Naas, County Kildare, Ireland.

History
The theatre is owned by 'The Moat Club', which was formed in 1954 with the intention of providing the Naas area with facilities to be used for dramatic theatre and table tennis. In 1960 the Moat Club purchased the Christian Brothers school and converted the upper rooms into a hall for table tennis. The lower rooms were converted into a 125-seat theatre in 1963, and called The Moat Theatre. It was renovated in the early 2000s, re-opening in 2003 as an accessible, 200-seat studio/black box theatre.

The Moat Club and Moat Theatre derive their names from the ancient motte, a reputed meeting-site of the Kings of Leinster.

Events
The theatre plays host to local, national and international stage productions, live music and comedy, children's theatre, art exhibitions, classes and workshops.

A country market took up residence in the foyer in February 2019 and is held every Friday morning.

References

External links
Official site

Theatres in County Kildare